Poetas Puertorriqueños is a compilation album from Puerto Rican singer Roy Brown. It features eleven songs from Brown's previous albums, that are based on poems from Puerto Rican writers like Luis Palés Matos and Juan Antonio Corretjer, among others. It also features a new, unreleased song titled "Ay, ay, ay de la grifa negra", based on a poem by Julia de Burgos. The album was released under Brown's label Discos Lara-Yarí in 1992. The album was also sponsored by the Puerto Rican Committee for the Celebration of the 500th Anniversary of the Discovery of Puerto Rico.

Track listing

Personnel

Musicians 
 Anabell López - vocals on "Ohé Nené"
 Pablo Milanés - vocals on "Negrito bonito"

Notes 

1992 compilation albums
Roy Brown (Puerto Rican musician) albums